Dr. Marc Kern is a Los Angeles based psychologist whose practice is focused on substance abuse and addiction treatment. In 2013 he and Adi Jaffe, Ph.D. founded Addiction Alternatives, a Beverly Hills-based addiction treatment program.

Kern began as a professional architect, then returned to college, becoming a licensed clinical psychologist in California. He is also a Certified Addiction Specialist, a Certified Rational Addictions Therapist, and is certified by the American Psychological Association in the Treatment of Alcohol and Other Psychoactive Substance Use Disorders. Dr. Kern was one of the founding members of SMART Recovery, Rational Recovery, and Moderation Management.

Books by Dr. Marc Kern 
 Take Control, Now!, Life Management Skills, Inc, 1994
 Responsible Drinking, New Harbinger Publications, 2002

References

External links 

Living people
21st-century American psychologists
1948 births
California School of Professional Psychology alumni
20th-century American psychologists